Southeastern Louisiana University (Southeastern) is a public university in Hammond, Louisiana. It was founded in 1925 by Linus A. Sims as Hammond Junior College. Sims succeeded in getting the campus moved to north Hammond in 1928, when it became known as Southeastern Louisiana College. It achieved university status in 1970.

In the fall of 2019 there were 14,298 students enrolled. During the 1990s, Southeastern was one of the fastest-growing colleges in the United States.  The university is the third largest in Louisiana, trailing only LSU and the University of Louisiana at Lafayette.

Southeastern's colors are green and gold, and the mascot is a lion named Roomie. Southeastern's sports teams participate in NCAA Division I (FCS for football) in the Southland Conference.

History

Hammond Junior College was created in 1925. It was managed by the Tangipahoa Parish School Board and initially offered only a teaching certificate. The college moved to the Hunter Leake estate in north Hammond in 1927 to accommodate more students. The following year, its name changed to Southeastern Louisiana College and it joined the state's educational system under the state's board of education.

Lucius McGehee Hall was built in 1935.  it is the oldest building constructed by the university. McGehee Hall is on the National Register of Historic Places.

The college's curricular offerings increased significantly in 1937 when the college received approval to offer bachelor's degrees. The first ones were awarded two years later.

Although Act 388 in 1938, an amendment to the 1920 Louisiana Constitution, granted the college the same legal status as other four-year colleges in the state, it did not provide for increased funding for the college.

In 1946 the college received initial accreditation from the Southern Association of Colleges and Schools. Subsequent enrollment growth following the end of World War II required additional expansion and construction. This included the use of two steel barracks donated to the college; these were used as dormitories and named McNeely Hall (which was demolished in 2007).

The college's curricular offerings grew again in 1960 when the college established the Division of Graduate Studies. The college awarded its first graduate degree in 1967, the Education Specialist degree. The college completed the War Memorial Student Union in the mid-1960s; it claims to be "the only student union building in the United States dedicated to alumni who died in World War II." In 1970, the institution officially became Southeastern Louisiana University.

After years of planning and fundraising, the Southeastern Louisiana University Center was constructed. An 8000-seat (more if the floor level is used) arena, the University Center hosts all home basketball games and a variety of civic, cultural, and big-name entertainment events.

Fanfare, a festival celebrating the arts, humanities, and sciences, was begun in October 1986 by university faculty. It has grown into a month-long event.

In 1996 SLU joined the University of Louisiana System.

The university began to implement screened admissions standards in the fall of 2000. The following year, Southeastern took ownership of the historic Columbia Theatre for the Performing Arts in downtown Hammond. The theater is operated by a separate foundation and presents a variety of theatrical works, concerts, and dance performances.

Southeastern Louisiana University played an important role in supporting students in the state and region in 2005. The university was not damaged by Hurricane Katrina so it was able to host nearly two thousand students from areas that were effected. A fountain was dedicated in 2007 to the victims of Hurricane Katrina and Hurricane Rita;  it is the only such memorial fountain in existence.

John Alario, dean of the Louisiana State Senate, is a graduate of Southeastern. Another Southeastern alumnus was the late State Representative Donald Ray Kennard, who began representing parts of East Baton Rouge and Livingston parishes starting in 1976. Kennard is also a former president of the Southeastern Alumni Association. See also Southeastern Louisiana University alumni.

Southeastern offers has its University Center for commencement exercises of high schools throughout the Northshore Region and actively encouraging area high school students to continue on to the university level.

Southeastern owns the Columbia Theatre for the Performing Arts in Hammond's Historic District. First opened in 1928, the Columbia was acquired by the university in the 1990s and renovated in the amount of $5.6 million. The large foyer is dedicated to the late State Senator John Hainkel, who was instrumental in obtaining the funding for the renovation.

Academics

Southeastern Louisiana University is accredited by the Commission on Colleges of the Southern Association of Colleges and Schools (SACS) to award degrees at the Associate, Baccalaureate and Master's levels. Southeastern has been accredited by the Southern Association of Colleges and Schools since 1946.

Southeastern consists of five colleges with 18 academic departments and programs offering over 60 degree programs.

Southeastern's state-of-the-art Sims Library houses several important collections, including the Morrison Room, the Rayburn Collection, the Pineywoods People Exhibits, and the Center for Regional Studies.The Bill Evans archives are housed at the library.  

The campus is also home for the state's sole commemoration of the governorship (1936–1939) of Richard W. Leche (1898–1965). It is a large medallion on the north exterior wall of the east side of Strawberry Stadium.</ref>

Southeastern offers nursing curricula in Hammond and Baton Rouge. In a consortium with the University of Louisiana at Lafayette Southeastern offers a master of science in nursing.

Southeastern became a doctoral-granting institution in 2005 with the inauguration of a doctor of education in higher education leadership.

Southeastern's business programs are accredited by the Association to Advance Collegiate Schools of Business (AACSB). The Southeastern Business School is located in Garret Hall. Southeastern was the first institution in Louisiana to achieve AACSB's separate and special accreditation in accounting. Graduates of both the MBA program and the Executive MBA program are serving widely in education and industry.

In the aftermath of Tulane University's post-Katrina decision to close several engineering programs including computer engineering, Southeastern received approval from the Louisiana Board of Regents to develop an undergraduate curriculum in engineering technology within the Department of Computer Science & Industrial Technology.

Campus locations 
 Southeastern's main campus is located in Hammond in Tangipahoa Parish.

 Baton Rouge Center, Baton Rouge. The focus is nursing education.
 Livingston Parish Literacy and Technology Center, Walker
 Turtle Cove Environmental Research Station, a field research and educational facility located in Manchac, Louisiana, to study the Lake Pontchartrain estuarine ecosystem.

Student life

Fraternities and sororities 
There are 19 national or international social Greek letter organizations governed by three councils.

Greek life

Panhellenic Council
 Alpha Omicron Pi 1963
 Alpha Sigma Tau 1940
 Phi Mu
 Sigma Sigma Sigma 1964
 Theta Phi Alpha 1990

Interfraternity Council
 Delta Tau Delta 1969
 Kappa Alpha Order 1980 (not recognized by the university)
 Kappa Sigma 1989
 Pi Kappa Alpha (closed 2022)
 Sigma Tau Gamma 1939
 Tau Kappa Epsilon 1961 (Reinstalled 2022)
 Theta Chi 2000
 Theta Xi 1963 (Reinstalled 2023)

National Panhellenic Council
 Alpha Kappa Alpha
 Alpha Phi Alpha
 Delta Sigma Theta 1976
 Kappa Alpha Psi
 Omega Psi Phi
 Phi Beta Sigma
 Sigma Gamma Rho
 Zeta Phi Beta

Athletics

Southeastern Louisiana sponsors 16 NCAA Division I level varsity teams compete in the Southland Conference.

Southeastern has several state-of-the-art athletic facilities, including an eight-lane all-weather running track completed in 2011 (see inset).

Media 
Southeastern's major campus media and publications are the Lion's Roar (newspaper), KSLU (FM radio station), ByLion (weekly online publication), the Southeastern Channel (public access cable television channel), and Le Souvenir (official yearbook).

The Lion's Roar 
The Lion's Roar is the official newspaper of the students of Southeastern Louisiana University. Distributed on Tuesdays, it is published weekly during regular semesters and monthly during the summer semester. The Lion's Roar is planned, written, designed, created, and published by the students of Southeastern Louisiana University working in the Office of Student Publications, a part of the Division of Student Affairs. The Lion's Roar has been in continuous publication since 1937.

KSLU radio station 
Southeastern's KSLU-FM radio station began operation on November 11, 1974, as a radio club at the university, operating at 10 watts of power. Initially the station was on the air a few hours a day during the week; the transmitter was turned off during weekends and holidays. Thanks to support from the Student Government Association and self-assessed fees of the student body, in 1983 the station qualified for membership in the Corporation for Public Broadcasting. Since that time the station has grown to 3,000 watts, the maximum allowed because of the crowded 88–92 MHz band and the university's proximity to Baton Rouge and New Orleans.

In 1988, KSLU became the first radio station in the South to install a digital touchscreen operating system. The installation was featured in Broadcast Engineering magazine and visited by radio personnel from across the world.

The broadcast schedule offers non-commercial programs, with offerings including local talk shows, entertainment and sports news, campus and community activities.

In 1993, an emergency-situation room was added using amateur radio equipment purchased with grants from State Farm Insurance and Louisiana Power & Light (a subsidiary of Entergy). During critical times, this room is staffed by local ham operators, members of the Amateur Radio Emergency Service in the Florida Parishes area.

In the past, the station produced several political forums which were fed to all public radio stations in Louisiana and to commercial stations via the Louisiana News Network.

The year 1996 brought another phase as KSLU began broadcasting globally via the internet, enabling families of international and out-of-state students to hear live university events.

A job at KSLU was the start of the media career of Robin Roberts.

ByLion 
ByLion is published weekly online (bi-weekly during the summer session) for the faculty and staff of Southeastern Louisiana University. This newspaper is very popular among freshman students.

Cable TV Channel 
The Southeastern Channel officially began July 9, 2002.

The Southeastern Channel won four Telly Awards in 2007. Staff member Steve Zaffuto won two Bronze Tellys for animation of "Native Sounds" and "Current Events" promotions, and Josh Kapusinski won a first-place Silver Telly for animation and a Bronze Telly for editing the "Florida Parish Chronicles" promo. Josh Kapusinski's "Florida Parish Chronicles" promo won a 2006 Emmy Award in the Suncoast Region.

Alumni of the public-access TV channel include Randi Rousseau, Christopher Guagliardo, Chris Lecoq, Matt Milton, Nick Brilleaux, Robbie Rhodes, Travis Connelley, Tim Tregle, Tim Tully, John Reis, Allen Waddell, Whitney Magee, and Chris Coleman.

Le Souvenir 
Le Souvenir is the official student yearbook of Southeastern. It is published annually and distributed to the student body in the fall semester. Le Souvenir is planned, written, designed, created, and published by the students of Southeastern working in the Office of Student Publications, a part of the Division of Student Affairs. Le Souvenir (French for "the memory") has been in continuous publication since 1929.

Notable people

Alumni
 Amir Abdur-Rahim, college basketball coach
 Robert Alford, professional football player
 Wilson Alvarez, professional football player
 Christine Amertil, 3 time Olympian and World Championship Silver Medalist
 Billy Andrews, professional football player
 Kayla Ard, college basketball coach
 Horace Belton, professional football player
 Bryan Bennett, professional football player
 Kirk Bullinger, professional baseball player
 Jerry Davis, professional football player
 Donald Dykes, professional football player
 Bill Evans, jazz pianist
 Calvin Favron, professional football player
 Gavin Fingleson, South African-born Australian, Olympic baseball player
 John Fred Gourrier, lead singer of John Fred & the Playboys (Judy in Disguise)
 Kevin Hughes, professional football player
 Kyle Keller, professional baseball player
 Cole Kelley, professional football player, Walter Payton Award Winner
 Nathaniel "Big Easy" Lofton, professional basketball player and member of the Harlem Globetrotters
 Wade Miley, professional baseball player
 Harlan Miller, professional football player
 Kevin Morgan, professional baseball player and executive
 Albie Reisz, professional football player
 Robin Roberts, television broadcaster
 Mac Sceroler, professional baseball player
 Carl Schutz, professional baseball player
 Charlie Smith, Louisiana lobbyist
 Bryan Spears, film and television producer
 Lynne Spears, author and mother of Bryan (above), Britney, and Jamie Lynn Spears
 Devonte Upson, professional basketball player in the Israeli Basketball Premier League
 Jeff Williams, professional baseball player
 Maxie Williams, professional football player

Faculty
 Rhett Allain, physicist and blogger
 Alfred J. Cox
 John L. Crain
 Barbara Forrest
 Tim Gautreaux
 Michael L. Kurtz

References

External links 

Southeastern Louisiana Lions athletics website

 
Buildings and structures in Tangipahoa Parish, Louisiana
Education in Livingston Parish, Louisiana
Education in St. Tammany Parish, Louisiana
Education in Tangipahoa Parish, Louisiana
Educational institutions established in 1925
Hammond, Louisiana
Universities and colleges accredited by the Southern Association of Colleges and Schools
Universities and colleges in Baton Rouge, Louisiana
Tourist attractions in Tangipahoa Parish, Louisiana
Zachary Taylor
Public universities and colleges in Louisiana
1925 establishments in Louisiana